Renaud Dehousse is a Belgian lawyer and professor, born on the 2 June 1960 in Liège, Belgium. He is currently President of the European University Institute (EUI) in Florence, Italy.

Biography 
Renaud Dehousse was born in Liège in 1960, the second son of Agnes Denis and Jean-Maurice Dehousse. He became a student of law at the University of Liège (Belgium) and then obtained a doctorate from the European University Institute in Florence. He later took up various positions at the EUI, including professor and head of the Department of Law, before being appointed ordinary professor at the University of Pisa.

In 1999, Dehousse joined Sciences Po. There, he held the Jean Monnet Chair of European Law and Political Science at Sciences Po, Paris and also directed the Centre for European Studies. He was a scientific advisor to the centre for study and research founded by Jacques Delors, Notre Europe. He was also a visiting professor at the University of Michigan, the University of Lausanne and the University of Florence.

Dehousse has been President of the European University Institute (EUI) in Florence, Italy, since September 2016. Dehousse follows Joseph H. H. Weiler in a role which has also been held by Marise Cremona, Josep Borrell Fontelles, Yves Mény, Patrick Masterson, Émile Noël, Werner Maihofer and Max Kohnstamm.

Research 
Dehousse's research interests revolve around comparative federalism and the institutional evolution of the European Union. During the 1990s, his research focussed on topics such as federalism and international relations, the eastern expansion of Europe and the results of the Maastricht Treaty. Whilst at Notre Europe, Dehousse worked on a critical evaluation of the Lisbon Strategy.

More recently, his research has come to focus on the transformation of governance at European level, particularly at the level of bureaucratic structures and the role of the Court of Justice in the European political system. He has published on topics relating to the European Union, European Commission, crisis, and hard and soft power in European governance. His recent publications include The European Commission of the Twenty-First Century (Oxford: Oxford University Press, 2013) and Delegation of Powers in the European Union: The need for a multi-principals model (West European Politics, 2008).

His academic research has been widely published in international academic journals including the Journal of Common Market Studies, American Journal of Comparative Law, West European Politics, European Journal of International Law and European Union Politics.

Dehousse has spoken publicly about the future of Europe with regard to issues such as populism, trade, European culture, intellectual pluralism, the future of Europe after Brexit, and the 60th anniversary of the Treaty of Rome.

References

External links 

 

Academic staff of Sciences Po
Academic staff of the European University Institute
European University Institute alumni
University of Liège alumni
Lawyers from Liège
1960 births
Living people
Presidents of the European University Institute